Clement Laird Vallandigham (July 29, 1820 – June 17, 1871) was an American lawyer and politician who served as the leader of the Copperhead faction of anti-war Democrats during the American Civil War.

He served two terms for Ohio's 3rd congressional district in the United States House of Representatives. In 1863, he was convicted by an Army court martial for publicly expressing opposition to the war and exiled to the Confederate States of America. He ran for governor of Ohio in 1863 from exile in Canada, but was defeated.

Vallandigham died in 1871 in Lebanon, Ohio, after accidentally shooting himself in the abdomen with a pistol, while representing a defendant in a murder case for killing a man in a barroom brawl in Hamilton.

Early life
Clement Laird Vallandigham was born July 29, 1820, in New Lisbon, Ohio (now Lisbon, Ohio), to Clement and Rebecca Laird Vallandigham. His father, a Presbyterian minister, educated his son at home.

In 1841, Vallandigham had a dispute with the college president at Jefferson College in Canonsburg, Pennsylvania. He was honorably dismissed, but he never received a degree.

Edwin M. Stanton, the future Secretary of War under President Lincoln, was Vallandigham's close friend before the Civil War. Stanton lent Vallandigham $500 for a law course and to begin his own practice. Both Vallandigham and Stanton were Democrats, but they held opposing views on slavery. Stanton was an abolitionist; Vallandigham an anti-abolitionist.

Political career

Ohio legislature
Shortly after beginning to practice law in Dayton, Ohio, Vallandigham entered politics. He was elected as a Democrat to the Ohio legislature in 1845 and 1846, and served as editor of a weekly newspaper, the Dayton Empire, from 1847 until 1849.

While in the Ohio state legislature, Vallandigham voted against the repeal of the "Black Laws" (laws against the civil rights of African-Americans), but he did want the question put to a referendum by the voters. In 1851, Vallandigham sought the Democratic nomination to be Ohio's lieutenant governor, but the party declined to nominate him.

House of Representatives
Vallandigham ran for Congress in 1856, but he was narrowly defeated. He appealed to the Committee of Elections of the House of Representatives, claiming that illegal votes had been cast. The House eventually agreed, and Vallandigham was seated on the next to last day of the term. The delay was due to "the division which had arisen in the Democratic party upon the Lecompton [slavery in Kansas] question." He was reelected by a small margin in 1858.

In October 1859, radical abolitionist John Brown raided Harper's Ferry, Virginia, seizing the United States Army Arsenal. Vallandigham happened to be passing through, and joined a group of government officials who interrogated the captured Brown as to his aims, which Brown stated were an attempt to set off a rebellion of slaves to secure their freedom. His comment on Brown was:

Vallandingham was pro-slavery, described in a hostile newspaper as "perform[ing] the dirty work of the Southern slavocracy". He was always a vigorous supporter of those "states' rights". He believed the federal government had no power to regulate any legal institution, which slavery at the time was. He also believed the states had an implied right to secede and that, legally, the Confederacy could not militarily be conquered. Vallandigham was a believer in low tariffs and that slavery was a matter for each state to decide. During the ensuing war, he would become one of Lincoln's most outspoken critics.

He was re-elected to the House in 1860. During the 1860 presidential campaign, he supported Stephen A. Douglas, although he disagreed with Douglas's position on "squatter sovereignty", which was used by detractors to describe popular sovereignty.

On February 20, 1861, Vallandigham delivered a speech titled "The Great American Revolution" to the House of Representatives. He accused the Republican Party of being "belligerent" and advocated a "choice of peaceable disunion upon the one hand, or Union through adjustment and conciliation upon the other." Vallandigham supported the Crittenden Compromise, which was a last minute effort to avert the Civil War. He blamed sectionalism and anti-slavery sentiment for the secession crisis. Vallandigham proposed a series of amendments to the Constitution. The United States would be divided into four sections: North, South, West, and Pacific. The four sections would each have the power in the Senate to veto legislation. The Electoral College would be modified, with the term of President and Vice-President increased to six years and limited to one term unless two-thirds of the electors agreed. Secession by a state could only be agreed to if the legislatures of the sections approved it. Moving between the sections was a guaranteed right.

Vallandigham strongly opposed every military bill, leading his opponents to charge that he wanted the Confederacy to win the war. He became the acknowledged leader of the anti-war Copperheads, and in an address on May 8, 1862, he coined their slogan: "To maintain the Constitution as it is, and to restore the Union as it was." It was endorsed by fifteen Democratic congressmen.

Vallandigham lost his bid for a third full term in 1862 by a relatively large vote, which loss meant he would be out of office early in 1863. However, his loss was at least partially due to redistricting his congressional district. Despite this loss, some still considered him to be a future presidential candidate.

As a lame duck Representative, Vallandigham delivered a speech in the House on January 14, 1863, entitled "The Constitution-Peace-Reunion". In it, he stated his opposition to abolitionism from the "beginning". He denounced Lincoln's violations of civil liberties, "which have made this country one of the worst despotisms on earth". Vallandigham openly criticized Lincoln's preliminary Emancipation Proclamation, charging that "war for the Union was abandoned; war for the Negro openly begun." He also condemned financial interests that were profiting from the war. "And let not Wall Street, or any other great interest, mercantile, manufacturing, or commercial, imagine that it shall have power enough or wealth enough to stand in the way of reunion through peace." Vallandigham added, "Defeat, debt, taxation, sepulchers, these are your trophies." Vallandigham's speech included a proposal to end the military conflict. He advocated an armistice and the demobilization of the military forces of both the Union and Confederacy.

Post-congressional activities

After General Ambrose E. Burnside issued General Order Number 38, warning that the "habit of declaring sympathies for the enemy" would not be tolerated in the Military District of Ohio, Vallandigham gave a major speech on May 1, 1863. He charged that the war was no longer being fought to save the Union, but it had become an attempt to free the slaves by sacrificing the liberty of white Americans to "King Lincoln".

The authority for Burnside's order came from a proclamation of September 24, 1862, in which President Lincoln suspended habeas corpus and made discouraging enlistments, drafts, or any other "disloyal" practices subject to martial law and trial by military commissions.

Arrest and military trial
On May 5, 1863, Vallandigham was arrested as a violator of General Order Number 38. His enraged supporters burned the offices of the Dayton Journal, the Republican rival to the Empire. Vallandigham was tried by a military court on May 6 and 7. Vallandigham's speech at Mount Vernon, Ohio, was cited as the source of the arrest. He was charged by the Military Commission with "Publicly expressing, in violation of General Orders No. 38, from Head-quarters Department of the Ohio, sympathy for those in arms against the Government of the United States, and declaring disloyal sentiments and opinions, with the object and purpose of weakening the power of the Government in its efforts to suppress an unlawful rebellion."

The specifications of the charge against Vallandigham were:

Vallandingham wrote that he knew his public opinions and sentiments aided the Confederate war effort, raised public skepticism against the Lincoln administration, raised sympathy for the Confederate soldiers, and encouraged Northerners to violate the wartime laws of the Union.

The peace proposal of France was true; Vallandigham had been requested by Horace Greeley to assist in the peace plan.

Captain James Madison Cutts served as the judge advocate in the military trial, and he was responsible for authoring the charges against Vallandigham. During the trial, testimony was given by Union army officers who attended the speech in civilian clothes, that Vallandigham called the president "King Lincoln". He was sentenced to confinement in a military prison "during the continuance of the war" at Fort Warren in Massachusetts. Vallandingham only called one witness in his defense, Congressman Samuel S. Cox. According to University of New Mexico School of Law Professor Joshua E. Kastenberg, because Cox was a well-known anti-war Democrat, his presence at the military court likely harmed Vallandigam's attempts at arguing his innocence.

On May 11, 1863, an application for a writ of habeas corpus was filed in federal court for Vallandigham by former Ohio Senator George E. Pugh. Judge Humphrey H. Leavitt of the Circuit Court of the United States for the Southern District of Ohio upheld Vallandigham's arrest and military trial as a valid exercise of the President's war powers. Congress had passed an act authorizing the president to suspend habeas corpus on March 3, 1863.

On May 16, 1863, there was a meeting at Albany, New York, to protest the arrest of Vallandigham. A letter from Governor Horatio Seymour of New York was read to the crowd. Seymour charged that "military despotism" had been established. Resolutions by the Hon. John V. L. Pruyin were adopted. The resolutions were sent to President Lincoln by Erastus Corning. In response to a public letter issued at the meeting of angry Democrats in Albany, Lincoln's "Letter to Erastus Corning et al." of June 12, 1863, explains his justification for supporting the court-martial's conviction.

In February 1864, the Supreme Court ruled that it had no power to issue a writ of habeas corpus to a military commission (Ex parte Vallandigham, 1 Wallace, 243).

Expulsion

Lincoln, who considered Vallandigham a "wily agitator", was wary of making him a martyr to the Copperhead cause and on May 19, 1863, ordered him sent through the enemy lines to the Confederacy. When he was within Confederate lines, Vallandigham said: "I am a citizen of Ohio, and of the United States. I am here within your lines by force, and against my will. I therefore surrender myself to you as a prisoner of war."

On May 30, 1863, a meeting was held at Military Park in Newark, New Jersey, where a letter was read from New Jersey Governor Joel Parker. Parker's letter condemned the arrest, trial and deportation of Vallandigham, saying they "were arbitrary and illegal acts. The whole proceeding was wrong in principle and dangerous in its tendency." However, the meeting was sparsely attended. The New York World reported on the meeting in Albany. Burnside suppressed publication of the World. On June 1, 1863, another protest meeting was held in Philadelphia.

On June 2, 1863, Vallandigham was sent to Wilmington, North Carolina, by President Davis and was briefly put under guard as an "alien enemy".

President Lincoln wrote the "Birchard Letter" of June 29, 1863, to several Ohio congressmen, offering to revoke Vallandigham's deportation order if they would agree to support certain policies of the Administration.

Vallandigham travelled to Richmond, Virginia, where he met with Robert Ould, a former classmate. He advised Ould that the Confederate army should not invade Pennsylvania, since it would unite the North against the Copperheads in the 1864 presidential election. However, a letter to the editor of The New York Times gave a different version, saying that Vallandigham encouraged the invasion.

Vallandigham then left the Confederacy on a blockade runner to Bermuda, and from there went to Canada. He then declared himself a candidate for Governor of Ohio, and actually won the Democratic nomination in absentia. (Outraged at his treatment by Lincoln, Ohio Democrats by a vote of 411–11 nominated Vallandigham for governor at their June 11 convention.) He managed his campaign from a hotel in Windsor, Ontario, where he received a steady stream of visitors and supporters.

Vallandigham asked the question in his address or letter of July 15, 1863, "To the Democracy of Ohio": "Shall there be free speech, a free press, peaceable assemblages of the people, and a free ballot any longer in Ohio?"

Vallandigham lost the 1863 Ohio gubernatorial election in a landslide to pro-Union War Democrat John Brough by a vote of 288,374 to 187,492, but his activism had left the people of Dayton divided between pro- and anti-slavery factions.

The Northwestern Confederacy
While in Canada, sometime around March 1864, Vallandigham became a leader of the Order of the Sons of Liberty, conspiring with Jacob Thompson, and other agents of the Confederate government, to form a Northwestern Confederacy, consisting of the states of Ohio, Kentucky, Indiana, and Illinois, by overthrowing their governments. Vallandigham requested money for weapons from the Confederates, and refusing to handle the money himself, it was given to his associate James A. Barrett. Part of the Confederate plan was to liberate Confederate prisoners of war.

Vallandigham crossed back to the U.S. "under heavy disguise" on June 14 and gave a passionate speech at an impromptu Democratic convention in Hamilton, Ohio the next day. In that speech he felt it necessary to lie about his involvement in a "subversive organization" which he didn't name.

President Lincoln was informed of his return. On June 24, 1864, Lincoln drafted a letter to Governor Brough and General Heintzelman stating "watch Vallandigham and others closely" and arrest them if needed. However, he did not send the letter, and it appears he decided to do nothing about Vallandigham's return. In late August, Vallandigham openly attended the 1864 Democratic National Convention in Chicago. He was a District Delegate for Ohio.

The reception by the convention to Vallandigham was mixed. Vallandigham received "vehement applause". At one point Vallandigham's name was called out by the audience and the response was "applause and hisses". There were "cheers and hisses" on another occasion when he spoke.

Vallandigham promoted the "peace plank" of the platform, declaring the war a failure and demanding an immediate end of hostilities. In his acceptance letter, George B. McClellan made peace conditional on the Confederacy being ready for peace and ready to rejoin the Union. McClellan's stance conflicted with the Democratic Party Platform of 1864 which stated that "immediate efforts be made for a cessation of hostilities, with a view to an ultimate convention of the States, or other peaceable means, to the end that, at the earliest practicable moment, peace may be restored on the basis of the Federal union of the States." Vallandigham supported his party's nomination of McClellan for the presidency but was "highly indignant" when McClellan repudiated the party platform in his letter of acceptance of the nomination. For a time, Vallandigham withdrew from campaigning for McClellan. The contradiction between the party platform and McClellan's views weakened Democratic efforts to win voters over.

In late September 1864, the conspiracy trial of Harrison H. Dodd, William A. Bowles, Andrew Humphreys, Horace Heffren, and Lambdin P. Milligan, members of the Knights of the Golden Circle, a paramilitary organization founded in Cincinnati in 1854, which had morphed into the Order of American Knights before becoming the Sons of Liberty, began in Indianapolis before a military commission. George E. Pugh testified as a government witness. Testimony confirmed Vallandigham was "Supreme Commander" and James A. Barrett was the "Chief of Staff" to Vallandigham. Witnesses testified that a mysterious Mr. Piper had communicated to them on behalf of Vallandigham. According to the testimony of Felix G. Stidger, an undercover federal agent who infiltrated the Knights of the Golden Circle, the plan of Vallandigham was to begin a revolt sometime between November 3 and 17. The case went to the US Supreme Court, which, in 1866, in Ex parte Milligan, ruled that the use of military tribunals to try civilians when civil courts are operating is unconstitutional.

In April 1865, Vallandigham testified at the conspiracy trial of the American Knights in Cincinnati, Ohio. He admitted to conversing with Jacob Thompson, the Confederate agent in Canada. The intended revolt never materialized.

Post-war
In 1867, Vallandigham continued his stance against African-American suffrage and equality. However, his views later changed with the New Departure policy.

Vallandigham returned to Ohio, lost his campaigns for the Senate against Judge Allen G. Thurman and the House of Representatives against Robert C. Schenck on an anti-Reconstruction platform, and then resumed his law practice.

In 1871, Vallandigham won the Ohio Democrats over to the "New Departure" policy that would essentially neglect to mention the Civil War, "thus burying out of sight all that is of the dead past, namely, the right of secession, slavery, inequality before the law, and political inequality; and further, now that reconstruction is complete, and representation within the Union restored", but also affirmed "the Democratic party pledges itself to the full, faithful, and absolute execution and enforcement of the Constitution as it now is, so as to secure equal rights to all persons under it, without distinction of race, color, or condition." It also called for civil service reform and a progressive income tax (Items 10 & 12). It was against the "Ku-Klux Bill" (Item 17). "New Departure" was endorsed by Salmon P. Chase, a former Lincoln cabinet member and Chief Justice of the United States.

Death
Vallandigham died in 1871 in Lebanon, Ohio, at the age of 50, after accidentally shooting himself in the abdomen with a pistol. He was representing a defendant, Thomas McGehean, in a murder case for killing a man in a barroom brawl in Hamilton, Ohio. Vallandigham attempted to prove the victim, Tom Myers, had in fact accidentally shot himself while drawing his pistol from a pocket while rising from a kneeling position. As Vallandigham conferred with fellow defense attorneys in his hotel room at the Lebanon House, later the Golden Lamb Inn, he showed them how he would demonstrate this to the jury. Selecting a pistol he believed to be unloaded, he put it in his pocket and enacted the events as they might have happened, snagging the loaded gun on his clothing and unintentionally causing it to discharge into his stomach. Although he was fatally wounded, Vallandigham's demonstration proved his point, and the defendant, Thomas McGehean, was acquitted and released from custody (only to be shot to death four years later in his saloon). Surgeons probed for the pistol ball, thought to have lodged in the vicinity of Vallandigham's bladder, but were unable to locate it, and Vallandigham died the next day of peritonitis. His last words expressed his faith in "that good old Presbyterian doctrine of predestination". Survived by his wife, Louisa Anna (McMahon) Vallandigham, and his son Charles Vallandigham, he was buried in Woodland Cemetery in Dayton, Ohio.

Vallandigham was eulogized by James W. Wall, a former senator from New Jersey, who mentioned recently meeting with him about "New Departure". Wall had been imprisoned during the Civil War by Union authorities.

John A. McMahon, Vallandigham's nephew, was also a U.S. representative from Ohio.

In popular culture
Vallandigham's deportation to the Confederacy prompted Edward Everett Hale to write "The Man Without a Country". This short story, which appeared in The Atlantic Monthly in December 1863, was widely republished. In 1898, Hale made the assertion that Vallandigham stated "he did not want to belong to the United States".

Vallandigham is a character in some alternate history novels. In Ward Moore's Bring the Jubilee (1953) and William Gibson and Bruce Sterling's The Difference Engine (1991), Vallandigham defeated Lincoln in the Presidential election of 1864 after the South won the Civil War. In Harry Turtledove's The Guns of the South (1992), he is elected Vice President in the same year for the same reason.

In CBBC's Horrible Histories, Clement Vallandigham is played by Ben Willbond. In Horrible Histories he is shown as an excellent lawyer, however extremely embarrassed by the idiotic way in which he died, that is, having killed himself by accident when defending his client, Thomas McGehean.

See also

 Copperhead (politics)
 List of unusual deaths
 List of people pardoned or granted clemency by the president of the United States

References

Bibliography
 
 
 
 
 
 

Primary sources

Further reading
 Gottlieb, Martin. Lincoln's Northern Nemesis: The War Opposition and Exile of Ohio's Clement Vallandigham (McFarland, 2021).
   (extensive coverage on Vallandigham)
 Hostetler, Michael J. "Pushing the Limits of Dissent: Clement Vallandigham's Daredevil Tactics." Free Speech Yearbook 43 (2009): 85–92.
 Hubbart, Hubert C. "'Pro-Southern' Influences in the Free West, 1840–1865," Mississippi Valley Historical Review (1933), 20#1 pp. 45–62 in JSTOR
 Klement, Frank L. The Limits of Dissent: Clement L. Vallandigham and the Civil War (1998), a standard scholarly biography
 Mackey, Thomas C. Opposing Lincoln: Clement L. Vallandigham, Presidential Power, and the Legal Battle over Dissent in Wartime (Landmark Law Cases and American Society). (University Press of Kansas, 2020) online review
 
 Roseboom, Eugene H. "Southern Ohio and the Union in 1863," Mississippi Valley Historical Review (1952) 39#1 pp. 29–44 in JSTOR

External links

 
 Clement L. Vallandigham, The Online Books Page, University of Pennsylvania

1820 births
1871 deaths
19th-century American politicians
19th-century American newspaper editors
American anti-war activists
American exiles
American male journalists
American politicians convicted of crimes
Copperheads (politics)
Democratic Party members of the Ohio House of Representatives
People of Ohio in the American Civil War
Politicians from Dayton, Ohio
Ohio lawyers
Civilians who were court-martialed
Washington & Jefferson College alumni
Burials at Woodland Cemetery and Arboretum
Accidental deaths in Ohio
Firearm accident victims in the United States
Deaths by firearm in Ohio
Sprigg family
People from Lisbon, Ohio
Deaths from peritonitis
Infectious disease deaths in Ohio
Knights of the Golden Circle
American proslavery activists
John Brown (abolitionist)
Democratic Party members of the United States House of Representatives from Ohio
Prisoners and detainees of the United States military
Recipients of American presidential clemency